Konrad Czajkowski (born 11 January 1980) is a Polish cyclist. He competed in the men's team sprint at the 2000 Summer Olympics.

References

External links
 

1980 births
Living people
Polish male cyclists
Olympic cyclists of Poland
Cyclists at the 2000 Summer Olympics
Cyclists from Warsaw